Albinia is a town in Tuscany, central Italy, administratively a frazione of the comune of Orbetello, province of Grosseto, in the Tuscan Maremma.

Albinia is easily reached from Via Aurelia - it's about 33 km from Grosseto and 10 km from Orbetello - and from the Pisa-Grosseto-Rome railway thanks to its own station.

Main sights 
 Santa Maria delle Grazie, main parish church in the village, it was designed by engineer Ernesto Ganelli and consecrated in 1957.
 Torre delle Saline (Salt Fortress), built by the Republic of Siena in 14th century and fortified by the Spanish in 1630.

See also 
 Ansedonia
 Fonteblanda
 Giannella
 San Donato, Orbetello
 Talamone

References

External links 
 Tourism in Orbetello

Frazioni of Orbetello
Cities and towns in Tuscany
Coastal towns in Tuscany